The Outdoor Writers and Photographers Guild was established in 1980 as the Outdoor Writers Guild - a professional group for writers specialising in the outdoors. In 2006 the Guild changed its name to Outdoor Writers and Photographers Guild to recognise that members had professional skills in other areas to writing, with an informal strapline ‘Words and Pictures from the Outdoors’. Today’s membership includes writers, journalists, photographers, illustrators, broadcasters, film-makers, artists, web designers, publishers and editors, but all with the common bond of a passionate interest in the outdoors.

Most members are based in the UK although membership extends internationally. It has over 150 members and is run by a committee of members. The current chair is the prolific writer and journalist Stan Abbott.  His predecessor, whom he succeeded in October 2021, was the mountaineering writer and Boardman Tasker winner, Peter Gillman, who was chair for five years, and is now the guild's vice-chair.

Each year, the Guild hosts an AGM and Awards weekend, at various locations across the UK and Channel Islands. Previous destinations have included Isle of Wight, Snowdonia, Jersey, Shropshire and Northumberland. The weekend is an opportunity for members to come together for learning workshops, the awards ceremony, the Annual General Meeting as well as social events.

Awards
The Guild annually presents Awards for Excellence, which are open to members only, as well as a number of other awards to confirm its links with the outdoor trade.

Awards which members can enter include Outdoor Article/Feature, Technical Article/Feature, Guidebook, Photography, Digital, Outdoor Book

Recent winners can be found on the OWPG website under "Awards".

These include the prestigious Derryck Draper Award for Innovation, and the Golden Eagle Award, presented annually people who have 'rendered distinguished or meritorious service to the outdoors generally'.

Golden Eagle Award 
The Golden Eagle Award, an original watercolour painting by Guild member, David Bellamy, is presented to a person who has rendered distinguished or meritorious service to the outdoors generally. Past recipients have been:

2015–16: no award

2014: John Grimshaw 
2013: No award 
2012: Dr Adam Watson
2011: Bill Bryson 
2010: Jonathan Williams 
2009: Marion Shoard
2008: Sir Chris Bonington CBE
2007: W. R. 'Bill' Mitchell MBE
2006: Kate Ashbrook and Robin and Sue Harvey
2005: Doug Scott CBE
2004: Sir David Attenborough
2003: Alan Blackshaw and Cedric Robinson MBE
2002: John Cleare
2001: Tom Weir
2000: Irvine Butterfield
1999: Chris Brasher CBE
1998: Alan Mattingly
1997: Dr Rennie McOwan
1996: Walt Unsworth
1995: Ken Wilson

Derryck Draper Award 

In 2005, the Crystal award was renamed in memory of one of the Guild’s founder members and a past Chairman, Derryck Draper.
Award winners
2016: Pertex CS10 Technology fabric

2015: Osprey’s suspended AntiGravity™ backsystem

2014: Primaloft Down Blend Insulation
2013: Brunton Hydrogen Reactor 
2012: Biolite Campstove 
2011: Neoshell Fabric by Polartec 
2010: Laser Photon tent by TerraNova 
2009: Therm-a-Rest NeoAir mattress by Cascade Designs
2008: Teko socks system 
2007: Satmap Active 10 GPS

2006: Steripen

Crystal Award 

The Outdoor Writers Guild Crystal Award replaced the Golden Boot Award in 1999. It was presented for ‘innovation in the outdoors generally’.   
Award winners  
1999: Perseverance Mills (Pertex)    
2000: Brasher Boot Company   
2001: Nextec (Encapsulated Fabrics)   
2002: GoLite  
2003: Not awarded   
2004: Lyon Equipment

Golden Boot Award 

The Golden Boot Award was presented annually to a person or company exhibiting at the Camping and Outdoor Leisure Association (COLA) Show in Harrogate, who Guild members felt had made an outstanding contribution to the outdoors.
Award Winners
1982: Phoenix Mountaineering
1983: Berghaus 
1984: Carrington Performance Fabrics 
1985: Robert Saunders
1986: Buffalo
1987: Conway Trailers Ltd 
1988: Nick Brown (Nikwax) 
1989: Captain Harrison 
1990: Chris Brasher (Brasher Boot Company)
1991: Mike Parsons (Karrimor) 
1992: Gordon Conyers 
1993: Gordon Davison/Peter Lockey
1994: Ben Lyon
1995:Harvey Maps  
1996: Nick Brown (Páramo) 
1997: Bill Wilkins  
1998: Not awarded

Lifetime Achievement Award
The Guild presents a Lifetime Achievement Award "on an occasional basis to one of our own members for outstanding work in our professional field of outdoor writing, photography, or related fields".

 it has been awarded twice:

2014: Kev Reynolds 
2015: Hamish Brown

Sponsors
The OWPG is proud to work with various sponsors and Associate Members who support the Guild and are for the benefit of users, suppliers, the environment, OWPG members and the outdoors community generally. Currently, the OWPG closely works with Aquapac, Cicerone Press, Conway Publishing, Cordee, Patagonia, Pathfinder Guides and Viewranger.

References

External links
Outdoor Writers and Photographers Guild Official Website

Cultural organisations based in the United Kingdom